Joan Margaret Bielski, (27 November 1923 – 17 August 2012) was an Australian activist for equality for women in employment, education and public life.

Early life
Born at Narrabri, New South Wales to Francis Ward (a banker) and Doris (née Bull), the family moved to Armidale where Bielski attended St Patrick's Convent and later completed her intermediate certificate at St Mary's Convent in Gunnedah.

Career
Bielski graduated from the University of Sydney in 1949 and became a History, English and Economics teacher with the NSW Department of Education until 1974.

In 1972 Bielski was a founding member of the Women's Electoral Lobby (WEL) and also of the NSW Women in Education group (1973–1994).

On her retirement from teaching in 1974 Bielski spent three years as principal research officer to the Royal Commission on Human Relationships. In 1977 she was appointed head of the NSW Ministry of Education's Social Development Unit.

Awards and recognition
In the 1989 Australia Day Honours List, Bielski was named a Member of the Order of Australia (AM), "In recognition of service to the development of equal opportunities for women and girls, particularly in education".

At the second Edna Ryan Awards in 1999 Joan was named the Grand Stirrer.

The Queen's Birthday 2004 Honours List saw her named Officer of the Order of Australia (AO), "For service to the community, particularly through programs to encourage women's participation in political life and through continued contributions to the principles of equal opportunity, access to education and social reform."

Publications
 Women Engineers, Redress Press, 1988, 
 Coming to the Party? Women Into Politics, 1994, 
 A Women's Charter for Political Reform 2001. A charter for political equality for women and for good government for all Australian citizens, Women Into Politics, 2001, 
 The History, Organisation and Achievements of WEL NSW, Women's Electoral Lobby NSW Inc., 2005, 
 "Fear and Loathing in the Fifties", chapter in Dirty Secrets: Our ASIO Files, edited by Meredith Burgmann, NewSouth Publishing, 2014,

Personal
Bielski married Jerzy (George) Stefan Bielski in 1953. He was born in Stockholm in 1921 to Polish parents and survived four years in Auschwitz. After being liberated he migrated to Australia in 1949. George died in 2009. Bielski died in 2012 following a massive stroke.

References

External links
 Women's advocate smashed educational barriers, Jozefa Sobski, The Sydney Morning Herald, 13 September 2012

1923 births
2012 deaths
University of Sydney alumni
Officers of the Order of Australia
Australian activists
21st-century Australian women
21st-century Australian people
20th-century Australian women